Pål Jacobsen (born 20 May 1956) is a Norwegian football coach and former player.

His debut for Ham-Kam came at an age of 16 years and 358 days, and he is among the youngest players ever in the Norwegian top division. In the 1981 season Jacobsen became top goalscorer in the Norwegian top division scoring 16 goals. At this date he was playing for Vålerenga. He scored 13 goals in 42 caps for the national team.

Haunted by a failed achilles tendon operation in 1985, he chose to finish his career in 1987. The injury led to amputation in 2001.

Jacobsen currently works as an assistant coach for Ham-Kam, and as a freelance sports journalist in the local newspaper Hamar Arbeiderblad.

References

1956 births
Living people
People from Molde
Norwegian footballers
Norway international footballers
Hamarkameratene players
Vålerenga Fotball players
Eliteserien players
Hamarkameratene non-playing staff
Association football forwards
Sportspeople from Møre og Romsdal